Sport Integrity Australia is an executive agency of the Australian Government which commenced operation on 1 July 2020. The agency was established by the Parliament of Australia from the recommendations presented in the Report of the Review of Australia's Sports Integrity Arrangements, completed by the Department of Health.

Sport Integrity Australia will combine the operations of the Australian Sports Anti-Doping Authority, the National Integrity of Sport Unit of the Department of Heath, and the integrity programs of Sport Australia. The agency will focus on countering prohibited substances and methods, child abuse in sporting environments, unfair manipulation of games, and failures to protect those involved.

See also 
 Sports in Australia
 Drugs in sport in Australia

References

External links 
 
 
 
 

Sports governing bodies in Australia
2020 establishments in Australia
Government agencies established in 2020
Anti-doping organizations
Drugs in sport in Australia
Child sexual abuse in Australia
Cheating in sports
Match fixing